Earl Christian Campbell (born March 29, 1955), nicknamed "the Tyler Rose", is an American former professional football player who played as a running back in the National Football League (NFL) for the Houston Oilers and New Orleans Saints. Known for his aggressive, punishing running style and ability to break tackles, Campbell gained recognition as one of the best power running backs in NFL history.

Campbell played college football for the Texas Longhorns, where he won the Heisman Trophy and earned unanimous All-America honors in his senior season, as well as numerous other accolades. He was drafted first overall by the Oilers in 1978 and had an immediate impact in the league, earning NFL Rookie of the Year honors. Earl Campbell was named the NFL's Offensive Player of the Year in each of his first three seasons, during which he averaged nearly 1,700 rushing yards per season. He won the AP NFL Most Valuable Player Award in 1979 after leading the league in rushing yards and touchdowns.

With head coach Bum Phillips, Campbell's emergence in Houston coincided with the Luv Ya Blue era, a period of sustained success in which the Oilers made three straight playoff appearances. Campbell became the centerpiece of Houston's offense during the late 1970s and early 1980s. He was traded to the Saints six games into the 1984 season, where he spent his final season and a half before retiring. Campbell was inducted into both the College Football Hall of Fame (1990) and Pro Football Hall of Fame (1991). In 2019, he was named to the NFL 100th Anniversary All-Time Team. His jersey number is retired by the University of Texas and the Tennessee Titans.

Early life and high school
Earl Christian Campbell was born to Ann and Bert "B.C." Campbell, on March 29, 1955, in Tyler, Texas, leading to the nickname, "the Tyler Rose" later in his career. He was the sixth of 11 siblings. Bert Campbell died when Earl was 11 years old. He began playing football in fifth grade as a kicker, but moved to linebacker in sixth grade after watching Dick Butkus, whom he modeled his playing style after. Ann Campbell attempted to persuade Earl not to play football in high school. "I dis-encouraged Earl," she said. "But he always loved football." In 1973, he led the Corky Nelson–coached John Tyler High School to the Texas 4A State Championship (4A then was the largest classification in the state). That season, he was named Mr. Football USA as he was adjudged the national high school player of the year.

While heavily recruited, Campbell narrowed his choices to Houston, Oklahoma, Texas, Arkansas, and Baylor. After in-home visits from Barry Switzer from Oklahoma and Darrell Royal from Texas, Campbell ultimately chose Texas. Switzer, who unsuccessfully recruited Campbell, said in his 1989 book that Campbell was the only player he ever saw who could have gone straight from high school to the NFL and immediately become a star.

College career
Campbell attended the University of Texas at Austin, where he played college football for the Texas Longhorns from 1974 to 1977. As a freshman in 1974, he played in all 11 games and rushed for 928 yards and six touchdowns on 162 attempts. In 1975, he was a first-team All-America selection at fullback by the American Football Coaches Association, after he led the Southwest Conference with 1,118 rushing yards, 13 rushing touchdowns, and 78 points scored. Leg injuries kept him out of four games during his junior season, and he rushed for 653 yards and three touchdowns in seven games as Texas finished with a 5–5–1 record.

Campbell led the nation in rushing as a senior in 1977, with 1,744 yards and 19 touchdowns. In the third game of the season, against the Rice Owls, Campbell scored four touchdowns during a 72–15 blowout in which Texas kicker Russell Erxleben set an NCAA record with a 67-yard field goal. In his final regular-season game, Campbell rushed for a career-high 222 yards in a 57–28 victory over rival Texas A&M, and the Longhorns finished the regular season undefeated. After clinching the Southwest Conference championship, the top-ranked Longhorns then faced No. 5 Notre Dame, led by quarterback Joe Montana, in the Cotton Bowl Classic. Campbell carried 29 times for 116 yards in the game, but Notre Dame was victorious, 38–10, and claimed the national championship. Texas was ranked fourth in the final AP Poll.

Campbell was awarded the Heisman Memorial Trophy as the most outstanding college player after the season, becoming the University of Texas' first winner of the award. He also became the first recipient of the Davey O'Brien Memorial Trophy which was awarded to the outstanding player in the Southwest Conference. The Sporting News and United Press International each named Campbell the college football player of the year. He was a unanimous All-American, being named to the first team by every major selector. He finished his college career with 4,443 rushing yards and 40 rushing touchdowns in 40 games through four seasons.

College rushing statistics

Professional career

Houston Oilers
Campbell was the first overall draft pick in the 1978 NFL Draft, selected by the Houston Oilers, who signed him to a six-year, $1.4 million contract. The Oilers obtained the pick from the Tampa Bay Buccaneers by trading tight end Jimmie Giles, their first and second round picks in the 1978 Draft, and their third and fifth round picks in the 1979 Draft. "This is a commitment to excellence," said Oilers head coach Bum Phillips. "It takes a great running back to have a winning football team and this kid is a great running back." After rushing for a league-leading and rookie record 1,450 yards, Campbell was named the Offensive Rookie of the Year by the Sporting News and Associated Press (AP). He was also named the AFC Offensive Player of the Year by United Press International (UPI), NFL Offensive Player of the Year by the AP, and the NFL Most Valuable Player (MVP) by the Newspaper Enterprise Association (NEA) and Pro Football Writers of America (PFWA). Campbell's emergence contributed to the start of the Luv Ya Blue era in Houston.

With quarterback Dan Pastorini nursing a mid-season shoulder injury, Campbell carried the Oilers to a five-game winning streak in 1979, which concluded with a 30–24 win over the Dallas Cowboys on Thanksgiving Day, in which he rushed for 195 yards and two touchdowns. He finished the season with 1,697 rushing yards and 19 touchdowns, leading the league in both categories. He also set NFL records with eleven 100-yard rushing games, seven consecutive 100-yard games, and 368 carries. He was named NFL MVP by the AP, NEA, and PFWA. He also repeated as the AP Offensive Player of the Year, and won the Bert Bell Award as the league's most outstanding player.

With his aggressive running style which favored running over players instead of around them, questions began to arise over how long Campbell could stay healthy. "He runs with a lot of reckless abandon," said Ron Johnson, a former running back whose own career was cut short. "You can run like that in college. But you can't do that for 10 years and hope to survive." Pittsburgh Steelers running back Franco Harris said "Knocking over people can look very good but you can't do it forever. Sometimes it's going to be somebody else who knocks you over ... so the most important thing I think isn't to get a few extra yards every time but to make sure you're healthy enough to play." Bum Phillips, though, favored Campbell's running style. "I've been looking for a back like Earl," he said. "I'm not going to change his style. Why would I? You don't want a guy who gets hit and then flops on the ground. Earl does the same thing other backs do, only better."

After an 11–5 regular-season record in 1979, the Oilers defeated the Denver Broncos in the wild-card round for their first home playoff win since 1960. Houston then won the divisional round game against the San Diego Chargers despite both Pastorini and Campbell missing the game due to injuries. With both back in the lineup, however, the Oilers lost the conference championship game the following week against the Pittsburgh Steelers. Campbell was held to just 15 yards on 17 carries against Pittsburgh's "Steel Curtain" defense.

Campbell had his most productive rushing yardage season in 1980, with 1,934 yards in 15 games—an average of 128.9 yards per game. He finished 70 yards short of breaking O. J. Simpson's single-season rushing yards record set in 1973. He again led the league in rushing yards and touchdowns, and broke his own record for carries, with 373. Over 60 percent of his yards came in the fourth quarter. "That's when the tough get going," said Campbell. He had four games of over 200 rushing yards, a single-season record that still stands as of the end of the 2016 season. He also threw a 57-yard touchdown pass to receiver Billy "White Shoes" Johnson against the Steelers for his only career completion out of three attempts. The Oilers again finished with an 11–5 regular-season record, but lost the wild-card playoff game to the Oakland Raiders. For the third straight year, Campbell was awarded the Jim Thorpe Trophy by the Newspaper Enterprise Association as the league's MVP, and named the Offensive Player of the Year by the AP.

Bum Phillips was fired three days after Houston's loss in the wild-card game, and defensive coordinator Ed Biles was given the head coaching job. In 1981, the Oilers finished 7–9 and failed to make the playoffs for the first time with Campbell on the roster. Also for the first time, Campbell did not claim the rushing yards title, as he finished fifth in yards with 1,376 and seventh in touchdowns with 10. The highlight of the season was back-to-back rushing performances of over 180 yards, against the Bengals in Week 5 and the Seahawks in Week 6. His 39 carries against the Seahawks set an Oilers single-game record. Campbell was invited to his fourth Pro Bowl, but failed to make an All-Pro roster. A players' strike in 1982 shortened the season to nine games and the Oilers finished with a 1–8 record. Campbell had just two touchdowns and 538 rushing yards, an average of 59.8 yards per game—far below his average of 104.1 per game over the previous four seasons.

Campbell's production improved greatly in 1983 as he had 1,301 yards and 12 touchdowns, and was invited to his fifth Pro Bowl. However, the Oilers finished the season tied for the worst record in the league at 2–14. Unhappy after he was pulled in the second half against the Cincinnati Bengals in Week 10, Campbell demanded to be traded. He completed the season with the team but remained adamant with his demand in the off-season. "I'm tired of hearing every week how I'm too dumb, washed up, too dumb to read holes, can't block, can't catch the football," he said. The team's back-to-back dismal seasons also added to his frustration. In 1984, under new head coach Hugh Campbell, Houston started the season with six straight losses. After rushing for 278 yards total in the first six games of 1984, Campbell was traded to the New Orleans Saints, reuniting him with Bum Phillips.

New Orleans Saints
The Saints received Campbell in exchange for their first-round draft pick in 1985, with which Houston selected cornerback Richard Johnson. The trade came as a surprise in New Orleans; the team already had the young George Rogers, the 1981 No. 1 overall draft pick and that year's Rookie of the Year and rushing champion. With Campbell and Rogers, the Saints now had two Heisman Trophy winners in the backfield. In his first game with New Orleans, Campbell carried five times for 19 yards, and continued to have a diminished role in the offense throughout the rest of the season. He rushed for a total of 468 yards and four touchdowns in 1984, and failed to record a 100-yard game during the season.

His final 100-yard game was his only one in 1985: a 160-yard outburst against the Minnesota Vikings in which he scored his only touchdown of the season. He finished the year with 643 rushing yards on 158 carries. After considering a return for one more season to reach 10,000 career rushing yards, Campbell retired during the preseason of 1986, feeling that the beating he had taken during his career had taken too much of a toll. "I'm a man; I'm not a little boy," he said. "I believe this is the best thing—not only for myself, but for the Saints." He finished his career having carried 2,187 times for 9,407 yards and 74 touchdowns in the regular season.

NFL career statistics

Regular season

Postseason

Legacy and honors
Campbell is widely acknowledged as one of the best power running backs in NFL history, and was highly regarded by his peers. "Every time you hit him you lower your own IQ," said Redskins linebacker Pete Wysocki. Cornerback Lester Hayes of the Raiders said "Earl Campbell was put on this earth to play football." Cliff Harris, safety for the Cowboys, recalled Campbell as "the hardest-hitting running back I ever played against. He didn't have the elusiveness of an O. J. Simpson. But when you finished a game against Earl, you had to sit in a tub with Epsom salts." Bum Phillips, when asked if Campbell was in a class by himself, quipped, "I dunno. But if he ain't, it don't take long to call the roll."

Campbell is considered one of the greatest running backs in Texas Longhorns and college football history. He was inducted into the College Football Hall of Fame in 1990, along with fellow Heisman winner Jim Plunkett of Stanford. Campbell became the first Texas Longhorns football player to have his jersey retired by the university, his number 20 being retired in 1979. In 2000, an internet poll of Longhorns fans voted Campbell to Texas' All-Century team. He received the most votes, beating out recently graduated Ricky Williams.

On July 27, 1991, Campbell was inducted into the Pro Football Hall of Fame. Others inducted in the 1991 class were John Hannah, Stan Jones, Tex Schramm, and Jan Stenerud. He was introduced at the ceremony by Bum Phillips. Campbell's jersey number 34 was retired by the Oilers in 1987. He was inducted as one of six charter members into the Titans Hall of Fame in 1999, although he declined an invitation to the induction ceremony, stating, "I was a Houston Oiler, not a Tennessee Titan."

In 1999, Campbell was ranked number 33 on The Sporting News''' list of the 100 greatest football players, the highest-ranked player for the Houston Oilers franchise. In 2010, NFL Network ranked Campbell the 55th greatest player of all time in The Top 100: NFL's Greatest Players, and he was ranked by the sportswriter Max Bertellotti of the Turner Sports Network as the number 3 "power back" of all time, behind Jim Brown and John Riggins.

He was honored at halftime against Ohio State on September 9, 2006, including the unveiling of a  bronze statue of Campbell in the southwest corner of Royal-Memorial Stadium. The same year, Campbell was featured on the cover of Dave Campbell's Texas Football'', an honor that eluded him during his playing days.

In 2019, Campbell was one of twelve running backs selected to the NFL 100th Anniversary All-Time Team.

On January 13, 2020, Campbell was honored during the College Football Playoff National Championship for the 150th anniversary of college football. ESPN named him the 7th best college football player of all time.

He was declared an official State Hero in 1981 by the Texas legislature, an honor previously bestowed upon only Stephen F. Austin, Sam Houston and Davy Crockett.

A section of roadway in Tyler, Texas extending from Loop 323 to SH155 was named the Earl Campbell Parkway at its opening in 2012. In 2013, the Earl Campbell Tyler Rose Award, an award given to the best offensive player in NCAA Division I with Texas ties, was named in Campbell's honor.

Personal life
While at the University of Texas, Campbell was a member of the honorary men's service organization, the Texas Cowboys. As of 2016, he still actively participates in University of Texas athletics, where he serves as special assistant to the football team. In 1990, he founded Earl Campbell Meat Products, Inc. which manufactures and sells Earl Campbell's Smoked Sausage and other food products and barbecue sauce. Campbell and his associates also opened a restaurant in 1999 on Sixth Street in Austin called Earl Campbell's Lone Star BBQ, which closed in 2001.

Campbell has two sons: Christian and Tyler. Christian played high school football with Drew Brees, nephew of his father's former Longhorns teammate Marty Akins, at Westlake High and ran track for the University of Houston. Tyler was a running back for Pasadena City College and San Diego State but was forced to give up the sport due to multiple sclerosis (MS). He returned to Texas after graduation and divides his time between the family business and raising awareness of MS with his father.

Health
Campbell has experienced various physical ailments in his later life. By 2001, at age 46, he could barely close his fist due to arthritis in his hands. He developed foot drop due to nerve damage in his legs, and has difficulty bending his back and knees. He was diagnosed with spinal stenosis in 2009. Because of his difficulty walking he uses a cane or a walker, and for longer distances a wheelchair. Campbell at first maintained the ailments were genetic, but said in 2012, "I think some of it came from playing football, playing the way I did."

In 2009, Campbell became addicted to painkillers prescribed for his spinal stenosis, taking as many as ten OxyContin pills a day with Budweiser. He went through rehabilitation and broke his addiction the same year, and since publicizing the incident in 2013 has spoken out about the dangers of substance abuse.

See also
 List of Texas Longhorns football All-Americans
 List of NCAA major college football yearly rushing leaders
 List of NCAA major college football yearly scoring leaders
 List of first overall National Football League draft picks
 List of Tennessee Titans first-round draft picks

Notes

References

External links

 
 
 
 

1955 births
Living people
American football running backs
Houston Oilers players
New Orleans Saints players
Texas Longhorns football players
All-American college football players
American Conference Pro Bowl players
College Football Hall of Fame inductees
Heisman Trophy winners
National Football League first-overall draft picks
National Football League Offensive Rookie of the Year Award winners
Pro Football Hall of Fame inductees
Players of American football from Austin, Texas
Sportspeople from Tyler, Texas
African-American players of American football
21st-century African-American people
20th-century African-American sportspeople
National Football League Offensive Player of the Year Award winners
National Football League Most Valuable Player Award winners
National Football League players with retired numbers